Worry refers to the thoughts, images, emotions, and actions of a negative nature in a repetitive, uncontrollable manner that results from a proactive cognitive risk analysis made to avoid or solve anticipated potential threats and their potential consequences.

Definition

Worry is a category of perseverative cognition, i.e. a continuous thinking about negative events in the past or in the future. As an emotion "worry" is experienced from anxiety or concern about a real or imagined issue, often personal issues such as health or finances, or external broader issues such as environmental pollution, social structure or technological change. It is a natural response to anticipated future problems. Excessive worry is a primary diagnostic feature of generalized anxiety disorder, but also is pervasive in other psychological disorders, like schizophrenia.

Most people experience short-lived periods of worry in their lives without incident; indeed, a mild amount of worrying have positive effects, if it prompts people to take precautions (e.g., fastening their seat belt or buying insurance) or avoid risky behaviors (e.g., angering dangerous animals, or binge drinking), but with excessive worrisome people they overestimate future dangers in their assessments and in its extremities tend to magnify the situation as a dead end which results stress. Overestimation happens because analytic resources are a combination of external locus of control, personal experience and belief fallacies. Chronically worried individuals are also more likely to lack confidence in their problem solving ability, perceive problems as threats, become easily frustrated when dealing with a problem, and are pessimistic about the outcome of problem-solving efforts.

Seriously anxious people find it difficult to control their worry and typically experience symptoms like restlessness, fatigue, difficulty in concentrating, irritability, muscle tension and sleep disturbance.

Theories

Avoidance model 
The avoidance model of worry (AMW) theorizes that worry is a verbal linguistic, thought based activity, which arises as an attempt to inhibit vivid mental imagery and associated somatic and emotional activation. This inhibition precludes the emotional processing of fear that is theoretically necessary for successful habituation and extinction of feared stimuli. Worry is reinforced as a coping technique due to the fact that most worries never actually occur, leaving the worrier with a feeling of having successfully controlled the feared situation, without the unpleasant sensations associated with exposure. Noteworthy, studies also show that visual worry, i.e. worrying that occurs in visual modality, is also associated with increased anxiety and other psychopathology symptoms.

Cognitive model 
This model explains pathological worry to be an interaction between involuntary (bottom-up) processes, such as habitual biases in attention and interpretation favoring threat content, and voluntary (top-down) processes, such as attentional control. Emotional processing biases influence the probability of threat representations into the awareness as intruding negative or positive thoughts. At a pre-conscious level, these processes influence the competition among mental representations in which some correspond to the assertive power of worry with impaired cognitive process and others to the preventive power of worry with attentional control or exhaustive vigilance. The biases determine threatening degree and nature of worry content the worrier attempts to resolve the perceived threat and the redirection of anticipations, responses and coping in such situations.

There are some who respond to mental representations in an uncertain or ambiguous state in regard to the stressful or upsetting event. In this state the worrier is held in a perpetual state of worry. This is because availability of an overwhelming number(maybe 2 or 3, depending upon the worry-prone individual) of possibilities of outcomes which can be generated, it puts the worrier in a threatening crisis and they focus their attentional control voluntarily on the potential negative outcomes, whereas others engage in a constructive problem solving manner and in a benign approach rather than to engage with heightened anticipation on the possible negative outcome.

Philosophy
Greek thinkers such as stoic philosopher Epictetus and Seneca advised against worry. Albert Ellis, the creator of Rational Emotive Behavior Therapy, was inspired by the Stoics’ therapeutic ideas.

Religion

The biblical word used in Hebrew for worry regards worry as a combined form of fear and sorrow which affects nephesh, the totality of our being. The bible takes a fortitude-strengthening approach regarding worrying e.g. Psalm 94:
In the multitude of my anxieties within me, your comforts delight my soul.

In the New Testament, the Gospel of Matthew encourages:
And can any of you by worrying add a single hour to your span of life? ... So do not worry about tomorrow, for tomorrow will bring worries of its own. Today’s trouble is enough for today.

The Greek word used for worry in Matthew is merimnaō, which means to be anxious about, or to be troubled with cares.

St. Paul writes to the Philippian church, "There is no need to worry" and in the pastoral epistles, 2 Timothy 1:7 emboldens:
For God did not give us a spirit of cowardice, but rather a spirit of power and of love and of self-discipline.
Similarly James 1:2-4 motivates to face trials of any kind with joy, because they produce endurance (strength and courage). Further Saint Peter reveals his understanding of healthy living in Second Peter 1:3,5–7:
We have a sure hope ... this is a cause of great joy for us.

A late Indian spiritual teacher Meher Baba stated that worry is caused by desires and can be overcome through detachment:
Worry is the product of feverish imagination working under the stimulus of desires ... (It) is a necessary resultant of attachment to the past or to the anticipated future, and it always persists in some form or other until the mind is completely detached from everything.

Management 
The worry system is activated from exposure to a potential triggering event, traumatic experience or vulnerability, this brings worrisome thoughts and feelings which bring about physical stress reactions and response to avoid worrisome behavior, to ensure allostasis. But under the crisis this activity feeds back into the first worrisome thoughts and feelings which generates and strengthens the vicious worry cycle. Relaxation, risk assessment, worry exposure and behavior prevention have been proven effective in curbing the excessive worry, a chief feature of generalized anxiety disorder. Cognitive behavioral techniques hasn't branched out enough to address the problem holistically but therapy can control or diminish worry.

See also

References

Further reading

External links 
 Current theoretical models of generalized anxiety disorder (GAD): Conceptual review and treatment implications

Anxiety
Emotions
Psychological stress

vi:Lo âu